MV Roslagen may refer to:

, a car ferry that operated between Sweden and Finland, in the period 1988 to 2007
MV Roslagen (1977), a passenger ferry operating in the Stockholm archipelago, Sweden